The 1997 Botswana Premier League, also known as the 1997 Castle Super League for sponsorship reasons, was the 20th season of the Botswana Premier League. It was won by BDF XI.

Summary
BDF XI glided to a comfortable finish, opening a five-point gap to deny Gaborone United, Notwane and Mochudi Centre Chiefs (all of which were locked on second position)  the title and add a fifth to the trophy cabinet.

League table

References

Botswana Premier League
Botswana